Melicope macropus, the Kaholuamanu melicope, was a species of plant in the citrus family, Rutaceae.

It is extinct, and was endemic to the Hawaiian Islands.

References

macropus
Endemic flora of Hawaii
Extinct flora of Hawaii
Taxonomy articles created by Polbot